Epic: The Poetry of War is the fifth studio album by the Canadian death metal band Kataklysm.

Track listing

Personnel
Kataklysm
 Maurizio Iacono – vocals
 Stéphane Barbe – Bass
 Jean-François Dagenais – Guitar, record producer
 Max Duhamel – drums

Production
 Jean-François Dagenais - produced, engineered, mixed
 Louis Legault - engineering assistant
 Stéphane Barbe - engineering assistant
 Bernard Belly - mastering
 Maurizio Iacono - lyrics

References

External links
 Kataklysm - official website
 Nuclear Blast - official website
  Kataklysm Myspace page

2001 albums
Kataklysm albums
Nuclear Blast albums